Jean Sérafin (born 24 June 1941) is a French former footballer and coach.

He played for US Valenciennes and USL Dunkerque.

After his playing career, he became a coach with Le Touquet AC, RC Lens, OGC Nice, Nîmes Olympique, Tours FC, Al-Wahda FC, Club Africain, Red Star and Wuhan .

External links and references

Profile

1941 births
Living people
French footballers
Valenciennes FC players
Ligue 1 players
Ligue 2 players
French football managers
RC Lens managers
OGC Nice managers
Nîmes Olympique managers
Tours FC managers
Red Star F.C. managers
Club Africain football managers
Association football defenders
Expatriate football managers in Saudi Arabia
Sportspeople from Ariège (department)
Footballers from Occitania (administrative region)
Expatriate football managers in China
Expatriate football managers in Tunisia
French expatriate football managers
French expatriate sportspeople in Saudi Arabia
French expatriate sportspeople in Tunisia
French expatriate sportspeople in China
Wuhan F.C. managers